Alexandra Lencastre (born Maria Alexandra de Alencastre Telo Teodósio Pedrosa on September 26, 1965) is a Portuguese actress.

Career
Lencastre was born in Lisbon.  She left the Course of Philosophy at the Faculty of Arts of Lisbon to join the Lisbon Theatre and Film School (Escola Superior de Teatro e Cinema), where she graduated in Theatre (Actors Training) (1986). Win projection when working with Jorge Listopad the play Frei Luís de Sousa, Almeida Garrett (Actress Award Revelation, by APCT, 1986). Since then she collaborated with other directors such as Mario Feliciano, Orlando Neves, Carlos Avilez, Gaston Cruz, José Wallenstein, Rogério de Carvalho and John Lawrence, who directed her in his last theatrical experience, Fernando Krapp wrote me this letter from Dorst Tanked (1997). 
She became one of the most popular actresses on Portuguese television. She began to appear in the Portuguese version of the children's television series Sesame Street (1990), then she moved on to novels and series such as The People's Banker (1993), Cabaret (1994), Dear Teacher (2000), Rage to Live (2002), Hannah and the Seven (2003) (Golden Globe for Best Actress for TV, 2003), or more recently, Time to Live (2006) and Nobody else Tu (2005), where their presence earned high levels of audiences. Also for television, presented some programs, such as the controversial In Bed With ... (1993).

In the film stood out in the feature films of Fernando Lopes, The Dolphin (2002) (Golden Globe for Best Film Actress) and Out There (2004), which paired with Rogério Samora. He also starred in The Woman Who Believed U.S. President (2003), John Botelho. It was directed by other filmmakers, such as Teresa Villaverde, João Mário Grilo, António Pedro Vasconcelos, Joao Cesar Monteiro, John Canijo Leonel Vieira and Manuel Mozos.

Daughter of Theodosius Gouveia Jacinto Pedrosa, Coimbra, military, and his wife Maria Pestana de Adalgisa Alencastre Telo, Madeira, has an older brother of Pedro de Alencastre Telo Teodósio Pedrosa, born in 1964. She was married to actor Virgílio Castelo and the Dutch television producer Piet-Hein Bakker, between January 18, 1996, and 2003, the last marriage two children: Margaret (10 October 1996) and Catherine (1998). Another curiosity is that she is half-sister of journalist Ana Paula Ribeiro (born 1965 daughter of his father's relationship with Maria Idalina Ribeiro) and second cousin of the writer Inês Pedrosa.

In April 2007, The Biography Channel aired a biographical documentary on Alexandra Lencastre.

Television
 On Thin Ice - Fernanda Sequeira Lobo
 The Gypsy Heiress - Caetana Rivera
 The Only Woman - Pilar Sacramento
 Crossed Destinies - Laura Veiga de Andrade / Sílvia Moreira
 My Angel - Rita Joana Saraiva 
 My Love - Patricia Castro Mota 
 Conversation Rear - Presenter
 Ecuador - Maria Augusta Trinity (Main Cast)
 fascination - Ventura Margarida Miranda 
 Time to Live - Fatima Almeida 
 Nobody like you - Luiza Albuquerque 
 and the Seven Ana - Ana Cruz
 Rage to Live - Beatriz Lacerda Cabral
 Dear Professor - Helena
 Are not Man, are nothing - Victoria Palma Reis
 Risks - Lydia
 All the sauce and Faith In God - Eggy (co-star)
 Forgive me - Presenter
 In bed with ... - Presenter
 The People's Banker - Elizabeth (Main Cast)
 Icarus
 The Best Years - Daisy
 Sesame Street - Guiomar
 A Herdeira - Caetana Rivera

Cinema
 Corrupção 2007
 O Julgamento 2007
 Lá Fora 2004
 A mulher que acreditava ser Presidente dos EUA 2003
 Os Imortais 2003
 A Falha 2003
 The Dancer Upstairs 2002
 O Delfim 2002
 Um Passeio No Parque 2000
 Os Mutantes 1998
 Tráfico 1998
 Três Palmeiras 1994
 O Oiro do Bandido 1994
 O Fim do Mundo A Terra 1992
 Requiem para um Narciso 1992
 Xavier 1992
 O Medo 1992
 Entre Mortos e Vivos 1992
 Erros Meus 1991
 Filha da Mãe 1989
 Conversa Acabada
 Zénite
 A Última Viagem
 Meia Noite
 Quatro x Quatro

Theater
 Fernando Krapp Escreveu-me Esta Carta (1997)
 O Tempo e o Quarto (1993)
 Os Homens
 A Gaivota
 Estrelas da Manhã
 Terminal Bar
 Cenas da Vida de Benilde
 Quem Pode, Pode
 Lisístrata (1989)
 Erros Meus, Má Fortuna, Amor Ardente
 D. João no Jardim das Delícias (1988)
 O Pranto e as Almas
 Opereta (1988)
 O Balcão (1987)
 Tartufo (1987)
 O Indesejado
 Frei Luís de Sousa
 Pílades

External links
  Clube de Fãs Oficial da Alexandra Lencastre / Alexandra´s Official Fan Club

1965 births
Living people
Portuguese television actresses
Portuguese film actresses
Portuguese Roman Catholics
Actresses from Lisbon
Golden Globes (Portugal) winners
Lisbon Theatre and Film School alumni